Still Climbing is the second and final studio album released by American R&B trio Brownstone. It was released by MJJ Music and the Work Group on June 23, 1997 in the United States. The album contains the second line-up of the group after the departure of original member Monica Doby. She was replaced by Kina Cosper, whose first and only appearance was on this album before departing for a solo career in 2000. Still Climbing features the singles "5 Miles to Empty" and "Kiss and Tell" as well as "In the Game of Love" which originally appeared on the soundtrack to the 1996 film The First Wives Club.

Critical reception

In his review for Allmusic, senior editor Stephen Thomas Erlewine wrote that Still Climbing "suffers from the same inconsistent songwriting that plagued their debut From the Bottom Up, yet that isn't a fatal flaw. There are as many strong singles on Still Climbing as on the debut, and Brownstone sounds stronger and more confident on the record, making it an enjoyable, if tentative, step forward."

Track listing

Notes
 denotes co-producer
Samples
"Let's Get It Started" contains a sample from "Dance to the Drummer's Beat" as performed by Herman Kelly and Life.
"Love Me Like You Do" contains a sample from "A Love of Your Own" as performed by Average White Band.
"Foolish Pride" contains elements from the recording "La La for Love".

Personnel
 Keyboards and drum programming: Rodney Jerkins, Soulshock & Karlin, Big Yam & Victor Merritt, Tricky & Sean, Herb Middleton, Robin Thicke
 Guitar: John "Jubu" Smith
 Executive producer: Michael Jackson, Jerry Greenberg, Jono Kahan
 Mastering: Alan Yoshida
 Photography: Albert Sanchez
 Design: Gabrielle Raumberger, Clifford Singontiko

Charts

References

1997 albums
Brownstone (group) albums
Albums produced by Soulshock and Karlin
Albums produced by Robin Thicke
Albums produced by Rodney Jerkins